Nanospray desorption electrospray ionization (nano-DESI) is an ambient pressure ionization technique used in mass spectrometry (MS) for chemical analysis of organic molecules. In this technique, analytes are desorbed into a liquid bridge formed between two capillaries and the sampling surface. Unlike desorption electrospray ionization (DESI), from which nano-DESI is derived, nano-DESI makes use of a secondary capillary, which improves the sampling efficiency.

Principle of operation 
The typical nano-DESI probe setup consists of two fused silica capillaries  - primary capillary which supplies solvent and maintains a liquid bridge, and secondary capillary which transports the dissolved analyte to the mass spectrometer. High voltage (several kV) is applied between the inlet of the mass spectrometer and the primary capillary, creating a self-aspirating nanospray. The liquid bridge is maintained by continuous flow of the solvent and the contact area between the solvent bridge and sample surface can be controlled by changing the solvent flow rate, varying the diameter of the utilized capillaries and regulating the distance between the sample and the nano-DESI probe. In this way, the spatial resolution in mass spectrometry imaging applications can be improved, with typical resolution ranging between 100 - 150 μm.

Applications 
Nano-DESI has been applied for localized analysis of complex molecules and imaging of tissue sections, microbial communities and environmental samples.

References 

Mass spectrometry
Spatial analysis